Vlasina may refer to:

 Vlasina, a region in southeastern Serbia
 Vlasina (river), a river in Serbia
 Vlasina Lake, a lake in Serbia